Happy Nowhere is the debut studio album by the American rock band Dog's Eye View. The album is best known for its lead single, "Everything Falls Apart", which achieved considerable airplay and chart success in 1996.

The album was released at select retail locations in October 1995. Happy Nowhere received a nationwide release in the United States on January 30, 1996.

Chart
The album reached number one on the Billboard Heatseekers and number seventy-seven on the Billboard 200.

Track listing
"I Wish I Was Here " (composer: Peter Stuart) – 5:48
"Everything Falls Apart" (Stuart) – 3:54
"Small Wonders" (Stuart) – 4:02
"The Prince's Favorite Son" (Stuart) – 4:06
"Cottonmouth" (Stuart) – 4:24
"Haywire" (Stuart) – 5:59
"Would You Be Willing" (Stuart) – 3:02
"Speed of Silence" (Stuart) – 4:17
"Waterline" (Stuart) – 3:56
"What I Know Now" (Stuart) – 3:23
"Subject To Change" (Arch Alcantara and Peter Stuart) – 4:35
"Bulletproof and Bleeding" (Stuart) – 4:25
"Shine" (Stuart) – 6:40

Personnel
 John Abbey – double bass, electric bass, guitarrón, cello, guitar
 Alan Bezozi – drums, percussion 
 Oren Bloedow – electric guitar, baritone guitar, lap steel guitar, classical guitar, resonator guitar
 Marvin Etzioni – mandolin, electric guitar 
 Danny Frankel – percussion 
 Brad Peterson – backing vocals 
 Peter Stuart – Vocals, acoustic guitar, electric guitar

References

Dog's Eye View albums
1995 debut albums
Columbia Records albums
Albums produced by James Barton (producer)